V Graham Norton is a British chat show broadcast on Channel 4 in the United Kingdom starring Graham Norton, broadcast every weeknight as a successor to the weekly So Graham Norton. It aired from 6 May 2002 to 28 December 2003. It featured celebrities who chatted with Graham and became involved in studio games which were usually laden with sexual innuendo. The studio games were later featured on the clip show Nortonland in 2007 on digital channel Challenge.

The show features a 'webcam', a roving television camera which was randomly situated in a different place in the UK each week (though often in Covent Garden) and which followed Graham's instructions and allowed him to interact live with the public. The feature was made technically possible using digital microwave link technology provided by Rear Window Television with the 'spontaneous' webcam feature always produced as a full quality outside broadcast, before being made to look like a traditional webcam at the studio.

The most often repeated (and voted as the show's funniest) moment involved Graham and Dustin Hoffman interacting live with a passenger (and later, the driver) of a London taxi cab driving through the city. Another notable episode was with Harvey Keitel who was upset by Graham having an action figure with a gun based on his character in Reservoir Dogs.

Episode guide

References

External links
 

Graham Norton
2000s British comedy television series
2000s British television talk shows
2002 British television series debuts
2003 British television series endings
Channel 4 comedy
Channel 4 talk shows
English-language television shows
Television series by ITV Studios